Aniuta is a genus of moths in the family Oecophoridae.

Species
Aniuta melanoma Clarke, 1978
Aniuta ochroleuca Clarke, 1978

References

Oecophorinae